Ernesto Rubin de Cervin Albrizzi (5 July 1936 – 29 March 2013) was an Italian composer and teacher.

Biography
He was born in Venice in 1936. As a child he studied violin with Gian Francesco Malipiero at the Venice Conservatory, who suggested that he should start composition classes. He studied solfege with Bruno Maderna. After high school, he studied composition at the Florence Conservatory under Roberto Lupi and Luigi Dallapiccola.

Rubin de Cervin went to Rome in 1957 where he studied with Virgilio Mortari and Goffredo Petrassi. He got his composition diploma in 1960.

From 1965 to 1985 he taught, first solfege at the Liceo musicale in Udine, then didactic, analysis and composition at the Venice Conservatory. His teachings there established the New Venice School.

His disciples include Giuseppe Sinopoli.

External links
Article by Rubin de Cervin prefaced by Joachim Noller

1936 births
2013 deaths
Italian male composers